The 3rd FINA Open Water Swimming World Championships were held November 26 – December 2, 2004 in Dubai, United Arab Emirates. The championships featured 90 swimmers from 26 countries competing in six races:
5-kilometer (5K) – Men's and Women's
10-kilometer (10K) – Men's and Women's
25-kilometer (25K) – Men's and Women's

Results

Team medals

See also
2002 FINA World Open Water Swimming Championships
2006 FINA World Open Water Swimming Championships

References

HistoFINA--Open Water: FINA's history of open water swimming events.

FINA World Open Water Swimming Championships
Fina World Open Water Swimming Championships, 2004
Fina World Open Water Swimming Championships, 2004
Swimming competitions in the United Arab Emirates
International aquatics competitions hosted by the United Arab Emirates